Jake David Peck (born 9 January 2000) is an English professional footballer who plays as a midfielder for Concord Rangers on loan from Luton Town.

Career
Born in Luton, Bedfordshire, Peck signed scholarship terms with Luton Town in the summer of 2017. He made his professional debut as an 87th-minute substitute for Jorge Grant in a 3–0 home win over Milton Keynes Dons in an EFL Trophy group stage match on 9 October 2018.

On 10 March 2020, Peck joined Biggleswade Town on a one-month loan. However, he didn’t feature for the club after the coronavirus pandemic halted all levels of football. On 13 August 2021, he joined National League South side Concord Rangers on a season-long loan.

Career statistics

References

External links

2000 births
Living people
Footballers from Luton
English footballers
Association football midfielders
Luton Town F.C. players
Biggleswade Town F.C. players
Concord Rangers F.C. players